Union Level is a census-designated place in Mecklenburg County, Virginia. The population as of the 2010 Census was 188.

References

Census-designated places in Mecklenburg County, Virginia
Census-designated places in Virginia